A last is a mechanical form shaped like a human foot. It is used by shoemakers and cordwainers in the manufacture and repair of shoes. Lasts typically come in pairs and have been made from various materials, including hardwoods, cast iron, and high-density plastics.

The term is derived from the Proto-Germanic *laistaz ("track, trace, footprint"); cognates include Swedish läst, Danish læste, German Leisten.

Production

Lasts come in many styles and sizes, depending on the exact job they are designed for. Common variations include simple one-size lasts used for repairing soles and heels, durable lasts used in modern mass production, and custom-made lasts used in the making of bespoke footwear. Though a last is made approximately in the shape of a human foot, the precise shape is tailored to the kind of footwear being made. For example, a boot last would be designed to hug the instep for a close fit. Modern last shapes are typically designed using dedicated computer-aided design software.

Historically, lasts were typically made from and cast iron because these materials retain their shape, even when in contact with wet materials (like leather) and subjected to the mechanical stresses of stretching and shaping shoes on them. Today, wooden lasts are generally used only for bespoke shoemaking, particularly in Europe and North America.

The materials used in modern lasts must be strong enough to withstand the forces of mass production machinery, such as that applied by pullover machines when bottoming the shoe, and must also be able to hold tacks (known as "lasting tacks"), which are used to hold shoe parts together temporarily before the sole is added. Although hardwoods satisfy these criteria, modern lasts, especially those used by mass production factories in places such as China, are often made from high-density polyethylene plastic (HMW-HDPE), which allows for many tack holes before needing repair. Such plastics also have the benefit that they can be recycled when the last wears out.

Custom lasts
Cordwainers, or bespoke shoemakers, often use lasts that are specifically designed to the proportions of individual customers' feet. Made from various modern materials, they don't need to withstand the pressures of mass production machinery, but they must be able to handle constant tacking and pinning, and the wet environment associated with stretching and shaping materials such as leather.

See also
Shoe size
Jan Ernst Matzeliger (Lasting machine inventor)

References

External links

 History of lastmaking (lastmakingschool.com)
 What is a shoe last? (shoemakingcoursesonline.com)

Shoemaking